Abū Ḥafṣ ‘Umar al-Murtaḍā (died 1266)  was an Almohad caliph who reigned over part of present-day Morocco from 1248 until his death.

Life 
During his time as caliph, the area of Morocco under Almohad control was reduced to the region around and including Marrakesh. He was forced to pay tribute to the Marinids. He was ousted by his cousin Abu al-Ula al-Wathiq Idris with the help of Marinid ruler Abu Yusuf Yaqub ibn Abd Al-Haqq, with Idris II then proclaiming himself as caliph.

He was interested in Maghrebi script and established the first public manuscript transcription center at the madrasa of his mosque in Marrakesh.

References

Sources
Julien, Charles-André. Histoire de l'Afrique du Nord, des origines à 1830, Payot, Paris, 1994.

Year of birth unknown
1266 deaths
13th-century Almohad caliphs
People from Marrakesh
13th-century Berber people